Nils Erik Elias Andersson (born 31 January 1996) is a Swedish professional footballer who plays as a left back or midfielder for Allsvenskan side Djurgårdens IF.

Club career
Andersson started out as a youth player for his hometown club Hässleholms IF. In 2010, he joined Helsingborgs IF youth setup instead, although he still kept living in Hässleholm and commuted to Helsingborg. At the start of the 2013 Allsvenskan season, Andersson was moved up to the first team. On 15 April 2013, he became the youngest player ever to play a league game for his club when he made his debut at home against Mjällby AIF.

International career
In September 2013, Andersson was selected for the Sweden national under-17 football team. The team competed in the 2013 FIFA U-17 World Cup, where they went on to place third. He made his full international debut for Sweden on 12 January 2023, scoring from a free-kick in a friendly 2–1 win against Iceland.

Career statistics

International 

 Scores and results list Sweden's goal tally first, score column indicates score after each Andersson goal.

Honours 
Sweden U17
 FIFA U-17 World Cup Third place: 2013

References

External links

Eliteprospects profile

1996 births
Living people
Association football midfielders
Helsingborgs IF players
Varbergs BoIS players
IK Sirius Fotboll players
Djurgårdens IF Fotboll players
Allsvenskan players
Superettan players
Swedish footballers
Sweden youth international footballers
People from Hässleholm Municipality
Footballers from Skåne County